St. Joseph's Hospital Maracha, also Maracha Hospital, is a hospital in Maracha District, in the West Nile sub-region of the Northern Region of Uganda. It is a private, community hospital, serving the district of Maracha and surrounding communities.

Location
The geographical coordinates of St. Joseph’s Hospital Maracha are:03°14'17.0"N, 30°55'18.0"E (Latitude:3.238056; Longitude:30.921667).

Overview
The hospital is a private, non-profit, community hospital owned by the Roman Catholic Diocese of Arua and is accredited by the Uganda Catholic Medical Bureau. The planned capacity is 204 in-patient beds.

St. Joseph's Hospital Maraca was established in 1952, as an aid post. In 1953 is converted to a dispensary, and later a maternity centre, operated by the Comboni Missionary Sisters. The institution became a fully fledged hospital in 1972. The hospital was handed over to the Roman Catholic Diocese of Arua, in 1985. The diocese manages the hospital through a Board of Governors.

Hospital operations
As of December 2019, the hospital attended to 16,626 outpatients annually, on average. At that time, it admitted 6,145 inpatients, annually on average, with a bed occupancy ratio of 70.5 percent. There were 840 maternal deliveries every year on average, with a caesarian section ratio of 41.9 percent. At that time, patient user fees accounted for approximately 31.7 percent of total annual hospital income.

See also
Hospitals in Uganda

References

External links
 Official Website

Hospitals in Uganda
Maracha District
West Nile sub-region
Northern Region, Uganda
Catholic hospitals in Africa
1953 establishments in Uganda
1953 establishments in the British Empire